Joseph Leonard Votel (born February 14, 1958) is a retired four-star general in the United States Army who was commander of United States Central Command from March 2016 to March 2019. Before that, he served as commander of the United States Special Operations Command.

General Votel today serves as president and CEO of Business Executives for National Security (BENS) – a national, nonprofit composed of senior business and industry executives who volunteer their time and expertise to assist the U.S. national security community.

Early life and education
Born on February 14, 1958, in Saint Paul, Minnesota, Votel attended the United States Military Academy and was commissioned in 1980 as an Army Infantry officer.

His military schools include Infantry Officer Basic and Advanced Courses, United States Army Command and General Staff College, and the United States Army War College.

Military career

Votel's initial assignments were to the 3rd Infantry Division in Germany, where he served as a rifle platoon leader, executive officer, battalion adjutant, and rifle company commander. Following this tour, he was assigned to Headquarters, Allied Forces Southern Europe – Naples, Italy, and the NATO Peace Implementation Force (IFOR) in Sarajevo. He commanded the 2nd Battalion, 22nd Infantry (Light) at Fort Drum, New York, and afterward commanded the 1st Ranger Battalion. Later he commanded the 75th Ranger Regiment during Operation Enduring Freedom. On 19 October 2001, Votel led 200 Rangers from 3rd Battalion, who parachuted towards an airfield south of Kandahar in an operation known as Operation Rhino and attacked several Taliban targets.

As a general officer, Votel served in the Pentagon as the Director of the Army and Joint Improvised Explosive Device (IED) Defeat Task Force and subsequently as the deputy director of the Joint Improvised Explosive Device Defeat Organization established under the Deputy Secretary of Defense. He also served as the Deputy Commanding General (Operations), 82nd Airborne Division / CJTF-82, Operation Enduring Freedom, Afghanistan, and was subsequently assigned as the Deputy Commanding General of the Joint Special Operations Command, Fort Bragg. He next served as the Commanding General of the Joint Special Operations Command.

USSOCOM and USCENTCOM commander
On June 24, 2014, Votel was nominated by President Barack Obama to succeed Admiral William H. McRaven as the 10th Commander of United States Special Operations Command. The appointment was confirmed by Congress in July, and the change of command took place on August 28. Lieutenant General Raymond A. Thomas replaced Votel as commander of Joint Special Operations Command.

Votel became the commander of United States Central Command (USCENTCOM) on March 30, 2016. On April 23, 2018, Votel made his first official visit to Israel as CENTCOM commander. During his visit, Votel was scheduled to meet with Israeli Defense Force Chief of Staff, Gadi Eisenkot, National Security Adviser Meir Ben-Shabbat, and other senior defense officials.

As CENTCOM commander, Votel oversaw the United States' continued War on Terrorism in the Middle East, particularly the Combined Joint Task Force – Operation Inherent Resolve's fight against the Islamic State in Iraq and the Levant terror organization, which rose to prominence in 2014. The fight against the group saw CENTCOM become more involved in the Syrian civil war and Iraqi Civil War.

After nearly 40 years of military service, Votel officially retired on March 28, 2019, five days after the decisive Battle of Baghuz Fawqani, which saw the territorial collapse of the Islamic State in Syria. He was succeeded as CENTCOM commander by General Kenneth McKenzie, USMC.

2016 Turkey coup attempt

In a speech on July 29, 2016, Turkish President Erdoğan accused Votel of "siding with coup plotters", after Votel accused the Turkish government of arresting the Pentagon's contacts in Turkey.

Post-military career
In January 2020, Votel became president of Business Executives for National Security (BENS), where he made over $547,000 in 2021. He also serves as a non-resident senior fellow at the Belfer Center for Science and International Affairs, strategic advisor to aerospace manufacturer Sierra Nevada Corporation, and member of the board of trustees of Noblis.

Awards and decorations

References

External links

|-

|-

|-

1958 births
Colonels of the 75th Ranger Regiment
Living people
Military personnel from Minnesota
People from Saint Paul, Minnesota
Recipients of the Defense Distinguished Service Medal
Recipients of the Defense Superior Service Medal
Recipients of the Distinguished Service Medal (US Army)
Recipients of the Legion of Merit
United States Army Command and General Staff College alumni
United States Army generals
United States Army personnel of the Iraq War
United States Army personnel of the War in Afghanistan (2001–2021)
United States Army War College alumni
United States Military Academy alumni